Seaford railway station is the terminus of the Seaford line. Situated in the southern Adelaide suburb of Seaford, it is 35.9 kilometres from Adelaide station.

History
Seaford station opened on 23 February 2014 as part of the extension of the line from Noarlunga Centre. The line between Seaford Road and Griffiths Drive follows a similar alignment to the former Willunga railway line, and Seaford station is located approximately 300m from the site of the former Moana railway station, which is now housing.

The station is located between Griffiths Drive and Lynton Terrace and has two side platforms connected by an overhead walkway. It also functions as a bus interchange for the majority of bus services in this area, as well as providing a park & ride facility for approximately 450 vehicles and a kiss & ride area.

Services by platform

Transport links 

|}

|}

References

Railway stations in Adelaide
Railway stations in Australia opened in 2014